Károly Csanádi is a Hungarian former ice dancer. With Edit Mató, he is the 1966 Winter Universiade champion and a four-time Hungarian national champion. The duo competed at three World Championships and five European Championships. They placed within the European top ten in 1966 (Bratislava, Czechoslovakia), 1967 (Ljubljana, Yugoslavia), and 1968 (Västerås, Sweden).

Competitive highlights 
With Mató

References 

20th-century births
Hungarian male ice dancers
Universiade medalists in figure skating
Living people
Year of birth missing (living people)
Universiade gold medalists for Hungary
Competitors at the 1966 Winter Universiade